H. crocea may refer to:

 Hainesia crocea, a land snail
 Hectomanes crocea, a moth endemic to Australia
 Hesperocharis crocea, an American butterfly
 Homodes crocea, an owlet moth